The Boise Metropolitan Statistical Area is served by six major television stations, two daily newspapers, three major weekly newspapers and 19 major commercial radio stations.

The area is also home to a number of non-profit radio stations, a magazine, and a number of online publications.

Television and radio

Public radio 
Public radio, listener-supported (through periodic fund drives) along with corporate and private sponsors, also has a place in Boise's radio marketplace.

Boise State Public Radio operates three radio stations, KBSU 90.3 FM, KBSX 91.5 FM, and KBSU-FM HD2. Through a system of repeater transmitters, these stations cover much of the populated area of Idaho, Eastern Oregon, and the northern border of Nevada.

KBSU concentrates on arts and entertainment, largely of classical music, but also carries a variety of other programming of news, eclectic musical tastes, and weekly programs such as Garrison Keillor's A Prairie Home Companion and Car Talk.  KBSX is the Boise area's NPR outlet for news and cultural programming, while KBSU-2 provides jazz programming.  These stations fill a niche in radio programming generally not covered in the mainstream commercial media and provide perspectives in culture and news not generally available elsewhere on the radio dial in this market.

KRBX 89.9 FM, Radio Boise, also serves the Treasure Valley. This is a volunteer based, listener supported, community radio station that is home to a number of locally produced public affairs programs as well as Democracy Now! It also features a variety of music programming across a broad spectrum of genres. It is run by volunteer DJs and often features local and touring bands live in studio.

Print media

Daily 
Two daily newspapers operate in the area, each with a different primary focus. The Idaho Statesman is based in Boise, and primarily focuses on the capital city but is considered the state's primary paper. The Statesman is owned by the McClatchy newspaper chain, based in California.

The Idaho Press-Tribune is based in Nampa, and focuses on Ada and Canyon County (including Caldwell).

Weekly 
The Boise Weekly is an alternative newspaper based in downtown Boise, focusing on news, arts and opinion for the greater Boise area.  The publication is owned and published locally.

The Owyhee Avalanche is a weekly newspaper in Homedale, Idaho, which is published Wednesday mornings and serves the Owyhee County area of Southwestern Idaho. It is owned by Owyhee Publishing.

Tidbits of Boise is a weekly newspaper found in places where people wait: restaurants, doctor's offices, hospitals, car repair centers, and shops.  It is published locally by Boise Media Group, Inc.

Other 
The Boise Journal is a city magazine based in downtown Boise, focusing on local interest, history and arts for the greater Boise area.  The publication is owned and published locally.

The Boise Home is a city home magazine based in downtown Boise, focusing on local building, home products and gardening for the greater Boise area.  The publication is owned and published locally.

Boise Lifestyle Magazine  offers monthly family and lifestyle magazine throughout the Boise and Treasure Valley areas. The publication is locally owned and published.

Online media 
Most of the region's legacy media outlets maintain an Internet presence.

Boise Journal and Boise Home are available online at imcmags.com.

KTVB-TV operates KTVB.com with repurposed and original content, as well as extensive weather, sports, traffic and other content. .

The Idaho Statesman offers IdahoStatesman.com with repurposed news, sports and classifieds content.

With the exception of KGEM-AM, all the above-listed commercial radio stations maintain an online website.

The Boise Weekly also publishes its content online at BoiseWeekly.com.

The  Porcupine Picayune (formerly the Boise Picayune) has been publishing "This, That & The Other Thing About Life, Liberty & The Pursuit Of Happiness" since 2007.

Boise Lifestyle Magazine publishes its content in print and online  throughout Boise and the surrounding areas. It offers stories, events calendar and business advertising.

ZIdaho.com is Idaho's largest online classifieds.  Started in 2000 by KTVB, it is now privately owned.

IdahoCalendar.com is an online events publication, showcasing events and attractions all over the State.

Cable 
Cable One has a monopoly over Boise and the majority of the Treasure Valley.

A non-profit organization operates TVTV, a locally produced Public-access television channel, which appears on Cable One channel 11.  Primary funding is provided by the City of Boise.

KTVB operates 24/7, entertainment channel television channel, which is available on Cable One channel 28, over-the-air on digital channel 7.2. The channel consists primarily of newscast repeats, as well as locally produced lifestyle and sports programming.  The channel also features some content from Northwest Cable News.

References

External links 
 BoiseTVRatings (operated by KTVB-TV)
 Radio-Locator.com entry for Boise
 Radio news and discussion for the Boise market

Lists of mass media by city in the United States
Mass media in Boise, Idaho